TUFESA is an inter-city bus line owned by Autotransportes Tufesa S.A. de C.V. operating in Northwestern Mexico and the Southwestern U.S. The company has a fleet of several hundred buses consisting of Volvo 9800's and Irizar i8 buses. TUFESA has routes covering several major cities in California, Arizona, and Utah, Las Vegas, Nevada in the U.S. with TUFESA International, and   Baja California, Sonora, Sinaloa, Nayarit and Jalisco in Mexico with normal TUFESA buses, although TUFESA International does offer routes to major Northwestern Mexico cities. TUFESA's buses vary based on what service the customer opts for. If you buy a basic economic ticket on the standard "Plus" service, you will most likely ride a Volvo 9800 or Irizar i8. If you buy a higher-class ticket, you'll get an Volvo DD 9800. TUFESA also operates a parcel shipping service called TUFESAPACK. It is used to ship packages that are too big to be classified as travel luggage. Packages shipped by TUFESAPACK are put into the luggage compartments of buses headed to the package's destination.

History 
TUFESA  was founded in 1993 in the Mexican state of Sonora. At the time, the company consisted of a single bus exclusively for local workers. The company then expanded to public intercity passenger transport.

In December 2022, Tufesa suffered a deadly accident near Baker CA after a driver veered of interstate 15. Reason for the crash is unknown

References 

Bus companies of Mexico
Bus companies of the United States
 Tufesa International
 Tufesa
 Tufesa Schedules
 Tufesa